Wyoming Highway 789 (WYO 789) is a  state highway in the U.S. state of Wyoming. WYO 789 travels south-to-north from the Colorado state line to the Montana state line. For most of its length, it is concurrent with other routes. It was the path of a formerly-proposed U.S. Route 789 that was canceled.

Route description
WYO 789 begins at the Colorado state line just south of Baggs. After Baggs, it continues north for about  until it reaches the county line.

After crossing the county line, WYO 789 travels north for about  where it reaches exit 187 of I-80/US 30. WYO 789 joins I-80/US 30 eastbound.

I-80/US 30/WYO 789 re-enter Carbon County. Just west of Rawlins, WYO 789 leaves at exit 211, joining I-80 Bus./US 30 Bus. through Rawlins.

US 287/WYO 789 continue in a northwest direction, passing through the towns of Jeffrey City and Sweetwater Station. About  from Sweetwater Station, US 287/WYO 789 enter Lander. WYO 789 joins US 26 until they reach Shoshoni. Here, US 26/WYO 789 intersect US 20 where WYO 789 continues north with US 20 west.

US 20/WYO 789 continue through the Wind River Canyon into Thermopolis. From there, the highway veers off in a northeasterly direction into Washakie County. From the Washakie county line, the highway travels approximately  before crossing the Big Horn River into Worland where it joins US 16/US 20.

Upon crossing into Big Horn County, US 16/US 20/WYO 789 veer back to the northwest and cross back over the Big Horn River after reaching Manderson.

Just to the north of Frannie, US 310/WYO 789 bends slightly to the west, so that the road is actually inside Park County by about 400 feet before reaching the Montana state line. At the state line, WYO 789 ends, while US 310 continues north.

History

WYO 789 was part of a 1950s proposal for a border-to-border U.S. Route 789 that would have traveled from Nogales, Arizona, to Sweet Grass, Montana. After the US 789 proposal was rejected by AASHTO, US 789 became part of a series of state highways numbered 789 traveling along the proposed route. Wyoming, however, was the only state that actually applied the number exclusively to existing highways (but only in some sections), whereas the other states simply added a concurrent SR 789 over existing highways. Because of this, all the states except Wyoming deleted the designation and removed the signs.

Major intersections

See also

References

External links

Wyoming Routes 500-789
Wyoming Highway 789
WYO 789 - US 310/Montana State Line to CO-13/Colorado State Line (see Wyoming 789)

Transportation in Carbon County, Wyoming
Transportation in Sweetwater County, Wyoming
Transportation in Natrona County, Wyoming
Transportation in Fremont County, Wyoming
Transportation in Hot Springs County, Wyoming
Transportation in Washakie County, Wyoming
Transportation in Park County, Wyoming
789